Magee may refer to:

People
Magee (surname)

Places and institutions
 Magee, Mississippi, a city in Simpson County, Mississippi, U.S.
 Magee, New York, also known as Magee's Corners, a hamlet in the Town of Tyre, Seneca County, New York, U.S.
 Magee, Queensland, a locality in Beebo, Goondiwindi Region, Australia
Magee railway station
 Magee College, a campus of Ulster University in Derry, County Londonderry, Northern Ireland
 Magee Secondary School, Vancouver, Canada
 Magee-Womens Hospital of University of Pittsburgh Medical Center, Pennsylvania, United States

Other uses
 Magee of Donegal, clothing manufacturer and retailer, County Donegal, Ireland
 Maniac Magee, a novel by Jerry Spinelli published in 1990
 Magee, a nickname for the cavity magnetron, a microwave vacuum tube device

See also
Magi (disambiguation)
Maji (disambiguation)
Majhi (disambiguation)
McGee (disambiguation)
McGhee, a surname
McGhie, a surname
McGehee (surname)
McGehee, Arkansas